John Simpson  (born 9 November 1954), is a British New Classical architect.

Education and career
Simpson studied architecture at University College London. 

Simpson is Principal of John Simpson Architects LLP, Chartered Architects and Urban Designers, London. 

He is a member of Royal Institute of British Architects. Simpson is part of the New Classical Architecture movement of contemporary architects designing in classical styles. A profile of Simpson's design for his own house featured on the Sky Arts programme The Art of Architecture in 2019.

In 1991, Simpson architected Ashfold House in West Sussex.

Major works
Masterplan for the area around St Paul's Cathedral, London (1992–1996).
The West Range of Gonville Court, Gonville and Caius College, Cambridge (1993–1996).
New buildings for Lady Margaret Hall, Oxford (2010–2017).
The Queen's Gallery, Buckingham Palace, London (2002).
Masterplan for Fairford Leys, a village outside Aylesbury, Buckinghamshire.
Walsh Family Hall of Architecture, University of Notre Dame.
Masterplan to reorganize Kensington Palace into a public visitor and community facility (2008–2012).

References

Richard John and David Watkin, John Simpson; The Queen's Gallery, Buckingham Palace and Other Works. Andreas Papadakis pub, London, 2002.
David Watkin, The Architecture of John Simpson: The Timeless Language of Classicism. Rizzoli International Publications, 2016.

External links
 John Simpson Architects LLP

Urban designers
British neoclassical architects
New Classical architects
1954 births
Living people
Alumni of The Bartlett
Commanders of the Royal Victorian Order
20th-century British architects
21st-century British architects